Ravil Rufailovich Sabitov (born 8 March 1968) is a Russian professional football coach and a former player. He is a coach with Riga FC Academy.

Club career
As a player, he made his debut in the Soviet Top League in 1989 for FC Dynamo Moscow.

Honours
 Soviet Top League bronze: 1990.
 Russian Cup winner: 1995.

European club competitions
 UEFA Cup 1993–94 with FC Lokomotiv Moscow: 2 games.
 UEFA Cup Winners' Cup 1995–96 with FC Dynamo Moscow: 1 game.

References

1968 births
Living people
Tatar sportspeople
Tatar people of Russia
Footballers from Moscow
Soviet footballers
Russian footballers
Association football defenders
Soviet Union under-21 international footballers
Russian expatriate sportspeople in Kazakhstan
Russian expatriate footballers
Expatriate footballers in Belgium
FC Dynamo Moscow players
FC Lokomotiv Moscow players
Soviet Top League players
Russian Premier League players
K.S.V. Waregem players
Russian football managers
Russian expatriate football managers
Expatriate football managers in Kazakhstan
Expatriate football managers in Latvia
Expatriate football managers in Finland
FC Khimki managers
FC Torpedo Moscow managers
FC Titan Reutov managers
FC Tobol managers
FK Jelgava managers